Empire Burlesque is the 23rd studio album by American singer-songwriter Bob Dylan, released on June 10, 1985 on Columbia Records.

Accompanied by multiple session musicians—including members of Tom Petty and the Heartbreakers, Mike Campbell, Benmont Tench, and Howie Epstein—the album has a distinct "80s style" aesthetic. Fans and critics continue to debate the album's merits, especially when compared to his 1960s and 1970s output.

Recording
Before embarking on a European tour in the summer of 1984, Dylan had spent a substantial amount of time recording demos of new songs in his Malibu home, accompanied at times by other musicians.

In rehearsals for the tour, Dylan attempted at least three of these new songs, and he occasionally found time to polish their lyrics during the tour.

When the tour was over, Dylan returned to New York and began work on his next studio album. As Clinton Heylin reports, Dylan recorded in sporadic sessions, as had become his norm, rather than "block-booking studio time" and recording in one concentrated period. The result was "an unprecedented expenditure of" time for recording a Dylan album, from July 1984 to March 1985 (although The Freewheelin' Bob Dylan had been recorded over a similarly long period).

To accommodate the casual nature of this process, Dylan chose to produce the sessions himself.
Arthur Baker, who had previously worked with New Order and Afrika Bambaataa, was later recruited for these sessions, but much of the production work would actually be Dylan's.

One of his first decisions was to forgo the use of a stable set of musicians. Instead, Dylan recorded with an eclectic mix of studio professionals. An aborted session with Al Green's band was held at Intergalactic Studios on July 24, 1984. A session with Ronnie Wood (formerly of Faces and currently with The Rolling Stones), Anton Fig (best known as the drummer for David Letterman's house band), and John Paris was held at Delta Sound Studios on July 26.

The Delta session produced two notable tracks: "Driftin' Too Far from Shore" and "Clean Cut Kid". The former was set aside and would not be finished until 1986, when Dylan recorded his next album, Knocked Out Loaded. The latter had originally been recorded during the Infidels sessions in 1983, but was not completed until now.

Wood later described his surprise at Dylan's lack of authority during the mixing process. "[The engineers would] say, 'Hey Bob, we don't need this,' and he'd say, 'Oh, okay.' And they'd make a mix to their ears, and he'd just stand outside and let them do it. And I'd be saying, 'Hey! You can't let these guys...Look!! They've left off the background vocals!' or 'What about the drums?!' But there would be something going on in the back of his head which didn't allow him to interfere. And yet if he'd have gone into the control room with the dominance that he had while we were cutting the stuff, it could have been mind-bending."

During one session between July and September 1984 (at the Power Station), Dylan demoed a song called "Go 'Way Little Boy", with Ron Wood and "cowpunk" rockers Lone Justice. Dylan and Wood also played on Lone Justice's version of "Go 'Way Little Boy", which was recorded at the same session and was ultimately released as a B-side to their single "Sweet Sweet Baby (I'm Falling)". A blues number entitled "Oh Baby" was also recorded with the same lineup but has never surfaced.

In terms of his own album, the New York sessions had so far been fairly unproductive. After six months of work, Dylan had only a few recordings that were deemed acceptable, and only two of these would eventually appear on Empire Burlesque. "Sometimes nothing comes out, and other times I get a lot of stuff that I keep," Dylan said at the time. "I just put down the songs that I felt as I wanted to put them down. Then I'd listen and decide if I liked them. And if I didn't like them I'd either rerecord them or change something about them." In November, Dylan returned to Los Angeles and began recording there.

An early session at Ocean Way Studios produced little if any work that was used for Empire Burlesque. Much time was spent covering other artists’ songs, including “In the Summertime” by Ray Dorset (not to be confused with Dylan's own song of the same name), "Freedom for the Stallion" by Allen Toussaint and “Help Me Make It Through The Night” by Kris Kristofferson.

Work became much more productive when Dylan continued work at Cherokee Studios in Hollywood. Recruiting Lone Justice drummer Don Heffington for the early December sessions, Dylan recorded an ambitious song he had co-written with playwright Sam Shepard, titled "New Danville Girl", as well as another song. Acceptable takes were recorded for both songs, though, despite positive feedback from his peers, Dylan ultimately omitted "New Danville Girl" from Empire Burlesque.

Regardless, he also found success on the next song, "Something's Burning, Baby", recorded at Cherokee on December 14. Benmont Tench, Mike Campbell and Howie Epstein, from Tom Petty's Heartbreakers, joined Heffington for the session.

Over the rest of the winter, Dylan recorded most of the tracks that were ultimately used for Empire Burlesque. On January 28, 1985, another session at Cherokee produced the master take for "Seeing the Real You at Last". This was followed by a brief stop at A&M Studios on January 28 and/or 29 to record his contribution to "We Are the World". On February 5, Dylan recorded master takes for two more tracks: "Trust Yourself" and "I'll Remember You". On February 14—Valentine's Day—Dylan recorded love songs, including Johnny Cash's "Straight A's in Love", but also one of his own, "Emotionally Yours". With the exception of the "We Are the World" session, all of these songs were recorded with Heffington, the three Heartbreakers and a few other session players at Cherokee Studios in Hollywood.

Between February 14 and 19, Dylan returned to New York City, resuming work at the Power Station. On February 19, he held a session with Roy Bittan on piano and Steve Van Zandt on guitar, both members of Bruce Springsteen's E Street Band. They recorded at least one usable take of "When the Night Comes Falling from the Sky", but Bittan and Van Zandt would not return for the remainder of the sessions.

The following day, Sly Dunbar and Robbie Shakespeare, better known as reggae recording artists Sly & Robbie, joined the sessions. They had previously worked with Dylan on Infidels. Along with female vocalists Queen Esther Marrow, Debra Byrd and Carolyn Dennis, the group recorded "Never Gonna Be the Same Again".

On February 23, Dylan returned to the Power Station with Sly & Robbie, his back-up singers and a number of session players, including Al Kooper, who filled in on guitar. The day’s work produced a significantly different version of "When the Night Comes Falling from the Sky", which was ultimately chosen over the "Van Zandt version" from a few days before.

Around this time, Dylan also revived from the Infidels sessions "Someone's Got a Hold of My Heart". "A song about being torn apart by irreconcilable demands," according to Clinton Heylin, in revision it was stripped of "just about every religious allusion from the original." Dylan retitled it "Tight Connection to My Heart" and set it aside for further overdubbing.

One final song was recorded on March 3, a brand-new composition no more than a few days old. Recorded live-to-tape with no editing, overdubbing or embellishment, "Dark Eyes" was also sequenced as the last song of the album.

Some further overdubbing was scheduled, but with recording essentially finished, Arthur Baker was left to mix the album. "I'm not too experienced at having records sound good," said Dylan. "I don't know how to go about doing that. With Arthur Baker...I just went out and recorded a bunch of stuff all over the place, and then when it was time to put this record together, I brought it all to him and he made it sound like a record."

Songs
The opening track, "Tight Connection to My Heart (Has Anybody Seen My Love)", was originally recorded for 1983's Infidels under the title "Someone's Got a Hold of My Heart" (eventually released on The Bootleg Series Volumes 1–3 (Rare & Unreleased) 1961–1991). It was re-written and re-recorded several times before finding its way on to Empire Burlesque. A lushly produced pop song riding a reggae groove courtesy of Robbie Shakespeare and Sly Dunbar (better known as Sly & Robbie), the love song was singled out as the best track on the album by the most recent edition of The Rolling Stone Album Guide. The track, which features Mick Taylor on guitar (from Dylan's 84 Tour), was also chosen as the first single for Empire Burlesque.

Clinton Heylin describes "Seeing the Real You at Last" as "a compendium of images half remembered from Hollywood movies", as many of the lyrics made "allusions to Humphrey Bogart movies, Shane, even Clint Eastwood's Bronco Billy."

The love ballad "I'll Remember You" was still played in concert until 2005, more so than all but one other song from Empire Burlesque. It was also featured, in an acoustic version, in the movie Masked & Anonymous, though not included on the released soundtrack.

"Clean-Cut Kid" was another song recorded during the Infidels sessions. The lyrics weren't finished until much later, and the finished result was included on Empire Burlesque. In the interim Bob gave the song to Carla Olson of the Textones as a thank you for her appearing in his first-ever video, for Sweetheart Like You. She included it on the Textones' debut album Midnight Mission and Ry Cooder was featured on slide guitar. A novelty song wrapped around sharp political commentary, the 'clean-cut kid' is an average American kid who's radically altered by his experience in the Vietnam War. Village Voice critic Robert Christgau praised it as "the toughest Vietnam-vet song yet."

When members of the press, as well as Dylan's own fans, dubbed Empire Burlesque as 'Disco Dylan', it was mainly for the song "When the Night Comes Falling from the Sky". An evocative song filled with apocalyptic imagery, it was originally an upbeat, piledriving rocker recorded with Steven Van Zandt and Roy Bittan, both members of Bruce Springsteen's E Street Band. Unsatisfied with the recording, Dylan and Baker radically recast the song as a contemporary dance track. (The earlier version was later released on The Bootleg Series Volumes 1-3 (Rare & Unreleased) 1961-1991.)

The penultimate song, "Something's Burning, Baby", is another song filled with apocalyptic imagery. A slow-building march accented with synthesizers, it was singled out by biographer Clinton Heylin as the strongest track on Empire Burlesque: "An ominous tale set to a slow march beat, [it] was a welcome reminder of his ongoing preoccupations with that dreadful day."

"Dark Eyes" features only Dylan on guitar and harmonica. According to earlier interviews and Dylan's autobiography Chronicles, it was written virtually on demand when Arthur Baker suggested something simpler for the album's final track. Dylan liked the idea of closing the album with a stark, acoustic track, particularly when the rest of the album was so heavily produced. However, Dylan didn't have an appropriate song. He returned to his hotel in Manhattan after midnight, and according to Dylan:

"As I stepped out of the  elevator, a call girl was coming toward me in the hallway—pale yellow hair wearing a fox coat—high heeled shoes that could pierce your heart. She had blue circles around her eyes, black eyeliner, dark eyes. She looked like she'd been beaten up and was afraid that she'd get beat up  again. In her hand, crimson purple wine in a  glass. 'I'm just dying for a drink,' she said as she passed me in the hall. She had a beautifulness, but not for this kind of world."

The brief, chance encounter inspired Dylan to write "Dark Eyes", which was quickly recorded without any studio embellishment. It is often quoted for its last chorus: "A million faces at my feet, but all I see are dark eyes."

A number of critics have noted the bizarre sources of inspiration behind some of the songs. As mentioned, some lines were lifted from old Humphrey Bogart pictures, but at least a few were taken from the sci-fi television show Star Trek. Author Clinton Heylin wrote that "one of the best couplets—'I'll go along with the charade / Until I can think my way out' (from "Tight Connection to My Heart")—actually comes verbatim from a Star Trek episode, 'Squire of Gothos'." Some say this line was originally used in the Humphrey Bogart movie Sahara, though this is erroneous.

Outtakes

One of the most famous outtakes from the EB sessions is "New Danville Girl". A satirical epic co-written with playwright Sam Shepard, it was originally an attempt at answering Lou Reed's song "Doin' the Things That We Want To" from his 1984 album New Sensations. (Reed was inspired to write "Doin' the Things That We Want To" after seeing one of Shepard's plays.)

"It has to do with a guy standing in line and waiting to see an old Gregory Peck movie (called The Gunfighter) that he can't quite remember; only pieces of it," says Shepard. "Then this whole memory thing happens, unfolding before his very eyes. He starts speaking internally to a woman...reliving the whole journey they'd gone on...We spent two days writing the lyrics. Bob had previously composed the melody line, which was already down on tape."

As Clinton Heylin notes, "allowing each line to raise questions that lead the listener across the flatlands of Texas and time, Shepard contributes a conversational tone that hints at the very mundanity the song's characters are seeking to transcend."

Session guitarist Ira Ingber recalls, "When we first recorded '[New Danville Girl],' we...made a cassette. And he took it out and started playing it. He came back the next day we were working and said, 'Yeah, a lot of people like this thing.' And then he didn't do anything with it. It's like he was doing it to spite people who were all liking it, and he just held on to it."

"New Danville Girl" would be re-written and re-recorded as "Brownsville Girl" for Dylan's next album, Knocked Out Loaded.

Another outtake, "Driftin' Too Far from Shore", was still unfinished when it was recorded in July 1984 at Delta Studios. The same recording would later be issued on Knocked Out Loaded after several major overdubs.

In addition to recording "Go 'Way Little Boy" during the Empire sessions, Dylan also recorded several other songs that did not make the final cut. He covered the 1950s classic "Straight A's in Love". He recorded a song with two widely different lyrics. The first was entitled "Waiting to Get Beat". Using the same music, he wrote new lyrics, and recorded a second version entitled "The Very Thought of You". Dylan also recorded a six-minute song entitled "Who Loves You More", which is a virtually finished take.

All the cut songs from Empire Burlesque have found their way into circulation, including alternate takes to every song that made the album, as well as three takes of "In the Summertime", and two full takes of "Freedom for the Stallion".

Dylan had numerous recordings from his Malibu recordings preceding his European tour in 1984. Though they were very informal, they were also used to demo songs and work out ideas that would later develop on Empire Burlesque. One composition titled "Angel of Rain (Almost Done)" was composed at these sessions. There’s no documentation suggesting Dylan recorded this during the formal Empire Burlesque sessions, but it clearly held his interest during the rehearsals for the European tour. "Angel of Rain" made a deep impression on keyboardist Ian McLagan in what was supposed to be a rehearsal for previously released material. "There was one beautiful song he played occasionally that he'd never recorded and never [fully] rehearsed with us either," recalls McLagan. "It was a tricky little number. We never knew the title, but he'd launch into it from time to time, leaving us totally in the dark."

In 1991, one significant outtake from the Empire Burlesque sessions was released on The Bootleg Series Volumes 1-3 (Rare & Unreleased) 1961-1991. An early version of "When the Night Comes Falling from the Sky", recorded on February 19, 1985, it featured Roy Bittan on piano and Steve Van Zandt on guitar; both men were better known as members of Bruce Springsteen's E Street Band. "The Van Zandt 'When the Night Comes Falling from the Sky,' [an] apocalyptic vision bristling with drama, sung without restraint, could have provided Dylan with another epic to counterbalance the mawkish filler he'd been recording since 'New Danville Girl'," writes Heylin. "Instead, Dylan again second-guessed some of his better lines...and absolutely one of his best vocals from a fraught decade, rerecording the song...with a whomping synthesizer and horns track..." Music critic Tim Riley argued, "the alternate take...has such an undeniably raunchy attitude (and guitar solo by Miami Steve Van Zandt) you wonder why Dylan stuck with the lifeless take that makes Empire Burlesque drift off on side two." The title of the album, Empire Burlesque, probably refers to a theater in Newark, NJ where strippers and comedians entertained (author Philip Roth mentions it in Portnoy's Complaint). If Dylan were inspired, it remains to be discovered. It might have been a stop on his way to visit Woody Guthrie in Greystone Park.

Reception and legacy

Upon its release, Empire Burlesque received generally positive reviews, most notably a full-page review in Time magazine, but a number of critics demurred on the production, reservations that presaged Empire Burlesque'''s poor reputation in later years.

Members of the press claimed Dylan was trying to achieve a then-contemporary sound on Empire Burlesque; Dylan jokingly replied that he didn't know anything about new music, adding "I still listen to Charley Patton."

In his Consumer Guide column for The Village Voice, critic Robert Christgau wrote, "At best [Dylan]'s achieved the professionalism he's always claimed as his goal...he's certainly talented enough to come up with a good bunch of songs. Hence, his best album since Blood on the Tracks. I wish that was a bigger compliment."

As promotion for Empire Burlesque'', music videos for "Tight Connection to My Heart", "When the Night Comes Falling from the Sky", and "Emotionally Yours" were produced and broadcast on MTV, with Paul Schrader (best known for his work with Martin Scorsese) directing the video for "Tight Connection to My Heart (Has Anybody Seen My Love)". However, album sales remained fairly modest.

Track listing

Personnel

Musicians
Track numbering refers to CD and digital releases of the album.

Production
Bob Dylan – producer
Josh Abbey – recording, engineer
George Tutko – engineer
Judy Feltus – engineer
Arthur Baker – mixing

Artwork
Nick Egan – cover design
Ken Regan – photography

Charts

Weekly charts

Year-end charts

Certifications and sales

References

1985 albums
Albums produced by Bob Dylan
Bob Dylan albums
Columbia Records albums